Òscar Ribas Reig (26 October 193618 December 2020) was an Andorran politician, lawyer, and businessman who became the prime minister of Andorra in 1982. He twice served as head of government, first from 8 January 1982 to 21 May 1984 and again from 12 January 1990 to 7 December 1994.

Early life and education 
Òscar Ribas Reig was born in Sant Julià de Lòria, Andorra, on 26 October 1936 to an Andorran father and a Catalan mother. He moved to Spain as a child, living in Barcelona where he attended La Salle Bonanova School and then graduated in law from the University of Barcelona in 1959. In 1961, he completed a master's degree in political philosophy from the University of Fribourg in Switzerland. He was married to Roser Duró Ribó and had five children.

Political career

Early political career
Ribas Reig's earliest political service was as Secretary to the City Council of his native Sant Julià de Lòria between 1963 and 1965. During that period, he held the Finance portfolio which, as there was then no institutionalized separation of powers, was a position comparable to that of Minister of Finance.

First term as prime minister (1982–1984)
During Andorra's institutional reform process, Ribas Reig was considered to be a possible new head of government, especially after the 1981 parliamentary election in which he was re-elected for the Sant Julià de Lòria parish.
When the position of prime minister was created, he was the first to be elected to the office on 8 January 1982. On 14 January, he presented to the General Council the first Executive Cabinet and the government program.

On 1 May 1984, he resigned due to lack of parliamentary support and the difficulties of trying to implement a new tax law. He was succeeded by Josep Pintat-Solans on 25 May.

Later terms as prime minister (1990–1994)
Ribas Reig was again elected head of government after the 1989 parliamentary election on 12 January 1990. In 1990, he signed a Customs Agreement with the European Economic Community. In 1992, Ribas Reig resigned after his efforts to introduce a new constitution securing civil human rights were blocked by conservatives. 

After the 1992 parliamentary election, on 5 May he was invested for a third time. His third term was highlighted by the ratification of the first Andorran Constitution by referendum on 14 March 1993, under which the principality formally abandoned the previous feudal system.

Ribas Reig founded the center-right political coalition National Democratic Group (Agrupament Democràtic Nacional), with which he ran for the 1993 parliamentary election, the first after the legalization of political parties. His candidacy won but failed to achieve an absolute majority. He was re-inaugurated on 19 January 1994, after reaching an agreement with the  New Democracy and Democratic National Initiative parties. In 1994, Andorra became a member of the United Nations, and Ribas Reig gave the admission speech at the United Nations General Assembly on 28 July 1993, which was the first delivered before the international parliamentary body in Catalan. 

On 25 November 1994, after losing the vote of confidence which he presented due to the crisis in the government coalition, Ribas Reig submitted his resignation from the position as head of government taking effect on 8 December 1994; the liberal opposition leader Marc Forné was named to succeed him.

Later life
After his political career, Ribas Reig returned to work at his family business group, where he was the president of the Banca Reig and vice president of the Agricultural Bank of Andorra, now Andbank. He was also the honorary president of Andbank from 2002 on. 

On 30 June 2005, Ribas Reig entered the Spanish Royal Academy of Economic and Financial Sciences in Barcelona, and remained an academician until his death in 2020. On 8 July 2009, the Andorran government named him special ambassador with the mission of developing relations with Europe, an office he held until 2015. In December 2020, Ribas Reig published his memoirs.

Ribas Reig died on 18 December 2020 at the age of 84 in his hometown. On 19 December, the government decreed a national day of mourning. His funeral was held on 20 December in Sant Julià de Lòria's church and presided over by Co-Prince Joan Enric Vives.

Honorary distinctions
 Honoris causa University of the Balearic Islands (1996).
  Commandeur of the Legion of Honour (2010).
  Medal of the Group of Ex-Syndics and Former General Councilors (GESCO) (2018).
 Honoris causa University of Georgia.

References

External links 
Oscar Ribas Reig Archives

|-

1936 births
2020 deaths
Heads of Government of Andorra
Andorran businesspeople
Andorran politicians
Finance Ministers of Andorra
Members of the General Council (Andorra)
Commandeurs of the Légion d'honneur
People from Sant Julià de Lòria
University of Barcelona alumni
University of Fribourg alumni